Detroit Public Schools Community District (DPSCD) is a school district that covers all of the city of Detroit, Michigan, United States and high school students in the insular city of Highland Park. The district, which replaced the original Detroit Public Schools (DPS) in 2016, provides services to approximately 50,000 students, making it the largest school district in the state.  The district has its headquarters in the Fisher Building of the New Center area of Detroit.

The school district has experienced extensive financial difficulties over a series of years. From 1999 to 2005, and from 2009 to the reorganization in 2016, the district was overseen by a succession of state-appointed emergency financial managers.

History

The district was established in 1842, and has grown with the city. Some of the schools in the district began as part of other school districts, including Greenfield Township and Springwells Township districts, as the areas these districts covered were annexed to the city of Detroit.

The district operated schools serving Detroit's large immigrant population including Italians, Poles, and Jews as well as African Americans who fled the south. Everett and its principal M. M. Rose served a predominantly African American school population. Bishop School served many Jewish students as well as Africans Americans such as Cora Brown.

In 1917, the board membership was changed from ward-based to at-large elections.

In 1999, the Michigan Legislature removed the locally elected board of education amid allegations of mismanagement and replaced it with a 7-member reform board. Six board members were appointed by the mayor and one appointed by the state superintendent of public instruction. The elected board of education returned following a city referendum in 2005. The first election of the new eleven member board of education, with four chosen at-large and seven by district, occurred on November 8, 2005. At the time the district's enrollment was slowly increasing and it had a $100 million surplus .

Before the district occupied the Fisher Building, its headquarters were in the Macabees Building in Midtown Detroit. The district paid the owner of the Fisher Building $24.1 million in 2002 so the district could occupy five floors in the building. This was more than the owner of the Fisher Building paid to buy the building one year earlier. The district's emergency financial manager, Robert Bobb, said in 2009 that he was investigating how the school board agreed to the lease in the Fisher Building. Reginald Turner, who served on Detroit School Board from 2000 to 2003, said that he was told that it would be less expensive to occupy the Fisher Building than it would to remodel the Maccabees Building.

In November 2004 an election in Detroit was held since the state takeover was sunsetting. On a 66% margin the voters agreed to return to having an elected school board. The board was selected in November 2005 and began its term in January 2006. The final full year that the board was in full control was the 2007–2008 fiscal year. By that time DPS had a $200 million deficit. The district's deficit was $369.5 million by the end of the 2007–2008 fiscal year, and its long-term debt was $1.5 billion.

In January 2009 Governor of Michigan Jennifer Granholm installed Robert Bobb as the emergency manager of DPS. She used Public Act 72 to appoint an emergency manager. In May 2011, Roy Roberts was appointed DPS's emergency manager by Governor Rick Snyder. By the time Roberts was appointed the DPS deficit was $686.5 million. In September 2011, a new statewide district, Education Achievement Authority, was to take over some of Detroit's failing schools as selected by the emergency manager with up to 16 expected. The deficit was $763.7 million by the end of the 2013–2014 fiscal year, and at that time its long-term debt was $2.1 billion. On January 13, 2015, Darnell Earley was appointed as the new emergency manager for the school district by Snyder.

Highland Park Community High School of Highland Park Schools closed in 2015, and at that time DPS assumed responsibility for high school education of students in Highland Park, Michigan.

From 1999 to 2016 the State of Michigan controlled DPS for all except three years, when the elected DPS board was in control.

By January 2016 various DPS teachers made complaints about health and safety issues at DPS schools. DPS teachers were striking in various "sickouts" that resulted in schools closing. At that time DPS staff members were uploading images of poor conditions at DPS schools to Twitter, using the tag @teachDetroit.

In 2016 a hearing was scheduled for Norman Shy of Franklin, owner of Allstate Sales, a DPS vendor of school supplies. The associated court filings reflect a total of 12 DPS principals and 1 administrator allegedly conspired with Shy in a scheme to fill their own wallets by approving invoices for supplies the schools never received.  The alleged corruption started in 2002 and did not end until January 2015.  For over 13 years, Shy billed DPS $5 million with $2.7 million feeding the corruption ring. The principals and administrator received kickbacks of more than $900,000.

In 2016 the Michigan Legislature created the Detroit Public Schools Community District to replace the original Detroit Public Schools, which exists to repay debts. It had 45,000 students in 2017. The new district will have an elected board.

Student achievement

National Assessment of Education  Progress (NAEP) 
In 2007, Education Week published study that claimed that Detroit Public School's graduation rate was 24.9%. Groups including state and local officials said that the study failed to take into account high school students who leave the district for charter schools, other school districts or who move out of the area.  Detroit Public Schools claim that in 2005–2006 the graduation rate was 68 percent and expected it to hold constant in 2006–2007. On February 14, 2009, the Detroit Free Press reported that United States Secretary of Education Arne Duncan had concern over the quality of education Detroit children were receiving. A spokesman later stated that Duncan had no specific plans for Detroit. The students in Detroit's public schools perennially score at the bottom compared to other large urban school systems.

Cass Technical High School, Renaissance High School, and Detroit School of Arts rank highly both statewide and nationally. However, at many schools some students still do not meet adequate yearly academic progress requirements.  Students that fail to meet those requirements struggle in both language and mathematics.

A team of DPS students from Western International High School and Murray-Wright High School took second place out of 552 teams from 25 countries in a robotics competition in Atlanta, Georgia. DPS students, most notably Bates Academy students, did well at the 42nd annual Academic Olympics in Eatonton, Georgia, winning many honors. The Duffield elementary and middle school chess teams both finished first in the 2007 statewide competition, and performed well in the national competition.  At a previous Annual National Academic Games Olympics, DPS students won 25 individual and 20 team first place awards.

Charter schools
Detroit has a public charter school system with about 54,000 Detroit students (2009–10). When charter school and Detroit Public Schools enrollments are combined, the total number of children in public schools in Detroit has increased. If growth trends continue, Detroit's charter schools enrollment will outpace the Detroit Public Schools by 2015. Officials at the Detroit Public Schools and Detroit Federation of Teachers oppose the expansion of charter schools.

The Thompson Educational Foundation financed a new University Preparatory Academy High School, and provides yearly scholarships on condition of meeting student performance goals. Follow up studies of the University Prep Academy class of 2007 shows that at least 90% went on to college, 83% of those who attended a four-year university re-enrolled for a second year, and 57% of those who attended a two-year college re-enrolled for a second year, beating national re-enrollment averages. However, these scores are below high performing DHS schools with selective enrollment such as Bates Academy, Burton International and Renaissance High School.

There have been significant calls for the Detroit Public Schools to cooperate more with charters, including renting unused schools to charters. In May 2008, the DPS board renewed contracts with six charter schools for two years. DPS leases some closed school buildings to charter school operators.

Leadership

Superintendent
In March 2007, the DPS board removed Superintendent William Coleman and replaced him with Connie Calloway. Lamont Satchel was named as Interim Superintendent. Coleman was still paid for the remainder of his contract.

Connie Calloway was removed after 18 months after accusations by the school board that she was behaving unprofessionally and exercising poor judgment. She later won a lawsuit for wrongful termination, and termination without due process in retaliation for filing a whistle-blowing lawsuit when the treasurer reported ongoing misappropriation of more than 77 million dollars per year in funds intended for the children of Detroit.

Past superintendents include Warren E. Bow, Kenneth S. Burnley, Charles Ernest Chadsey, Duane Doty, and John M. B. Sill.

Emergency financial manager
The District was under a state-appointed Emergency Manager from 2009 to 2017. The Emergency Manager has powers to make unilateral changes. All financial decisions have been made by the Emergency Manager.

From 2009 to 2011, DPS finances were managed by Robert Bobb who was appointed by former Governor Jennifer Granholm, and from 2011 to January 2015, by Roy Roberts who was appointed by Governor Rick Snyder. In January 2015, Governor Snyder appointed Darnell Earley as Roberts' successor. Earley resigned in February 2016 in the wake of criticism of his decision, when he was Emergency Manager over Flint, Michigan, to switch that city's water supply to the Flint River, resulting in the Flint water crisis.

As of March 2016, financial matters are under the control of a Transition Manager appointed by Governor Snyder, retired bankruptcy judge Steven Rhodes.

Dr. Nikolai Vitti was appointed as Superintendent of Detroit Public Schools Community District on May 23, 2017 on a five-year contract. In his first year, Dr. Vitti worked closely with the Detroit Board of Education to implement a 100-day plan that culminated with the development of a new Strategic Plan that focuses on raising student achievement, transforming the district's culture, improving staffing, developing the whole child, and ensuring financial responsibility. Before arriving in Detroit, Dr. Vitti led Duval County Public Schools (DCPS), the 20th largest school district in the nation with approximately 130,000 enrolled students in 200 schools, and a fiscal budget of $1.7 billion. During his four and a half years at DCPS, the district ranked among the first to fourth highest performing urban districts in the nation on the National Assessment for Education Progress.

Current Board of Education

Departments
 Office of College & Career Readiness – 3rd Floor, Albert Kahn Building

2012 changes

Schools closing
See: List of closed public schools in Detroit

On February 9, 2012, Emergency Financial Manager Roy Roberts announced the following school closings:

1. Burton Elementary School: Students will be reassigned to the new $21.8-million Mackenzie PK-8 School building on the old Mackenzie High School site.

2. Detroit City High School: Students will be reassigned to schools with existing Second Chance programs.

3. Detroit Day School for the Deaf: Students will be reassigned to schools with hearing-impaired programs.

4. O.W. Holmes Elementary-Middle School: Students will be reassigned to the new $22.3-million Munger PK-8 School. The new facility includes a two-story student arcade that will function as a dining court, student center and school square.

5. Kettering High School & Kettering West Wing: Students at Kettering High School will be reassigned to Denby, Pershing, Southeastern or King high schools. Students enrolled at Kettering West Wing will be reassigned to schools with existing special education programs.

6. Mae C. Jemison Academy: Students will be reassigned to Gardner Elementary School or Henderson Academy.

7. Maybury Elementary School: Students will be reassigned to either Earhart Elementary-Middle School or Neinas Elementary School.

8. Parker Elementary-Middle School: Students will be reassigned to the new $21.8-million Mackenzie PreK-8 School, which will include a large open media center. The building design will focus on student safety and will be environmentally responsible.

9. Robeson Early Learning Center: Kindergarten classrooms at Robeson will be reassigned to the main Paul Robeson, Malcolm X Academy building. All pre-K programs will relocate to Palmer Park Preparatory Academy, which has a surplus Pre-K capacity.

10. Southwestern High School: Students will be reassigned to either Western International or Northwestern high schools.

Schools being replaced with new buildings
 Mumford High School: The new $50.3-million Mumford High School is the largest school construction project in the district's bond program. The 239,900-square-foot high school will accommodate about 1,500 students and also will have a community health clinic.
 Burton International: Is replaced by the Burton Theater which reopened as Cass City Cinema the end of 2011.  The building also includes a montessori nursery, artist studios and law offices.

Schools consolidating
 Crockett High School and Finney High School were  consolidated into a $46.5-million, 221,000-square-foot high school being constructed at the site of Finney High School. It was named East English Village Preparatory Academy and accommodates up to 1,200 students. Students in grades 10–12 from Finney and Crockett high schools attend the new school, while 9th grade are required an entrance-admissions exam. If accepted, students must maintain a GPA of 2.5.
 Farwell Elementary-Middle School and Mason Elementary School will consolidated and renamed Mason Elementary-Middle School. The current Mason Elementary School building has closed, and all students currently enrolled at Mason will be offered enrollment at the new site. New students residing in the Mason Elementary School boundary will be assigned to either the new Mason Elementary-Middle School or Nolan Elementary-Middle School.
 Langston Hughes Academy and Ludington Magnet Middle School will consolidate and be named Ludington Middle School but will use the Langston Hughes Academy building.

Ethelene Crockett Academy was named after Dr. Crockett, the wife of the late Congressman George Crockett. Beloved historic leaders in Detroit, the name was changed by the first emergency manager ( actually by Governor Snyder)  to Benjamin Carson Academy.

Finney High School, named after abolitionist Jared Finney, was renamed East English Village Academy by the emergency manager.

Barbara Jordan Elementary School, named after the Black congresswoman, was renamed Palmer Park Academy.

Davis Aerospace, named after Tuskegee Airman Benjamin Davis, moved in 2013.

Finances
On December 8, 2008, State Superintendent of Public Instruction Mike Flanagan determined the district's inability to manage its finances and declared a financial emergency. Michigan Governor Jennifer Granholm appointed Robert Bobb as the emergency financial manager of Detroit Public Schools in 2009. His contract dictated a one-year tenure. The school district began selling 27 previously closed school buildings. On March 3, 2009, Bobb estimated that DPS's current year deficit would be greater than $150M, and requested early payments from the state to meet payroll. He declared that additional outside auditors would be required to properly assess the district's financial situation.

Twenty million dollars of the March 2009 debt was owed to the district's pension system. The DPS school board complained in 2009 that the deficit of $65 million for 2007–2008 school year was caused by accounting irregularities, including fringe benefits and paying teachers off of the books. Much of the deficit was discovered by outside auditors hired by former district Superintendent Connie Calloway in 2008.

The 2008–2009 edition of the Michigan Department of Education's ranking of Michigan Public School financial data showed the mean Detroit Public School teacher's salary stood at $71,031, more than 14% higher than the state average of $62,237. During the same period, the Michigan cohort graduation rate was 80.1%, while Detroit Public Schools' cohort graduation rate was 67.39%, 16% lower than the state average.

Demographics
In the 1970s DPS had 270,000 students. In 2014 the 2016 projected enrollment for DPS was 40,000.

As of January 2013 about 49,900 students attend Detroit Public Schools. As of that year about 9,000 of them, over 18%, have an Individualized Education Program (IEP) plan required by the Individuals with Disabilities Education Act of the federal government. At the same time, the state average is 12%. In 2012 about 17% had IEPs.

As of 2014 DPS had 6,092 students classified as bilingual, speaking over 30 languages. They included 4,972 Spanish speakers, 522 Bengali speakers, 258 Arabic speakers, 34 Romanian speakers, 29 Hmong speakers, and 277 students speaking other languages.

In the 2019–20 school year the racial makeup was 82% black, 14% Hispanic, 3% white and 1% Asian.

Dress code
Detroit Public Schools created a district-wide uniform dress code for students effective on May 11, 2006 for all students in grades Kindergarten through 12. This includes mandatory identification badges. Parents may opt their children out of the dress code for medical, religious, or financial reasons. Several schools, including Bates Academy and Malcolm X Academy, had uniform dress codes before the start of the district-wide policy.

Digital programs
On February 4, 2010, the Detroit Public Schools announced that it wants to digitize all its teaching and learning as part of the comprehensive plan to accelerate student achievement, within five years. Barbara Byrd-Bennett, the district's chief academic and accountability auditor, said the district is investing in high-tech tools to equip all 6th- to 12th-graders with computers and digitize all curriculum, textbooks and lessons plans district-wide. The $15 million product is part of a $40 million contract with Boston's Houghton Mifflin Harcourt, which marks the largest single deal for the book publisher.

The first step will be interactive Web-based portal called Learning Village that would be fully functioning by fall 2010. The Learning Village program will give DPS the ability to digitize its textbooks, curriculum and lesson plans. Teachers will have access to students' assessment results and prospective lesson plans to more quickly diagnosis struggling students. Parents can log into the system to track their students' progress, print additional worksheets and view cumulative test results for a teacher's entire class. The purpose of the Learning Village tool is to serve as a unified portal to connect students, teachers, parents and principals, and deliver real-time learning. DPS will also use $14.2 million in federal stimulus and Title I dollars for netbooks for all 36,000 students and 4,000 teachers in grades 6–12 for access to technology to support hands-on learning. Houghton Mifflin Harcourt is setting up a Detroit-based office with at least 13 employees for technical support, training and outreach. Detroit is the company's largest client.

Schools

See also

Government of Detroit
The Rise and Fall of an Urban School System
"A National Disgrace"

References

External links

 Detroit Public Schools

District boards of education in the United States
1842 establishments in Michigan
 
School districts established in 1842